Albert Collier, also known as Leeter Collier (9 July 1909 – 22 February 1988), was an Australian rules footballer in the (then) Victorian Football League.

Personal life
Albert Collier was born on 9 July 1909 in Collingwood, the seventh of the ten children of Albert Augustus Collier, signwriter, and his wife Hannah Josephine, née Binks, Albert grew up living opposite Victoria Park, the home ground of the Collingwood Football Club and was educated at the nearby Victoria Park State School.

He later married Mavis Thelma Leibie (1917–2003) and they had two sons.

Albert Collier died in 1988 at his home in Seaford and is buried at Frankston Cemetery.

Playing career
In 1924 both Albert and his brother Harry played for the Melbourne district club Ivanhoe and their strong performances led to the brothers being invited to try out for Collingwood. Albert Collier made his Collingwood debut in 1925 and soon established himself in the team. He initially played forward, but after a couple of seasons became a powerful centre half back, and he was a vital part of 'The Machine', the 1927-1930 Collingwood teams who won four premierships in a row. This feat has not been repeated to date.

In 1931,at the height of the Great Depression Collier left Collingwood as player/coach Cananore Football Club in Tasmania, winning the Tasmanian Southern League and Tasmanian State premiership and the William Leitch Medal. He went on to Captain, Tasmania in the State Carnival.

In 1933 Collier returned to Collingwood, and from 1935 to 1939 served as vice-captain with his brother Harry as captain. In each of those years the ‘Magpies’ contested the grand final, winning two further premierships (1935 and 1936).
They are the only  brothers in Australian Rules history to been Captain and Vice Captain in a Premiership team, they also both won Brownlow medals and played together in 6 Premierships.

Before the 1940 season the Collingwood committee forced the Collier brothers into a reluctant retirement, and Albert transferred to Fitzroy where he played in 1941 and 1942.

Collier later captain-coached Camberwell in the throw-pass era VFA from 1945 until 1946, earning acclaim for building and leading the team to the minor premiership and a losing Grand Final in 1946.

He later coached country teams at Kyneton and at Sea Lake.

Military service
In 1942, Collier enlisted in the Royal Australian Air Force where he served in an Aircraft Repair Depot until the end of the war.

Honours
Collier won the Brownlow Medal in 1929.

In 1996 he was inducted into the Australian Football Hall of Fame, and was named at centre half back in Collingwood's Team of the Century.

References

External links

 Albert "Leeter" Collier, in the Australian Dictionary of Biography
 
 
 Albert Collier's playing statistics from The VFA Project
 Albert Collier, at Boyles Football Photos
 Albert Collier 1925-1930, 1933-1939, at Collingwood Forever
 AFL Hall of Fame

1909 births
1988 deaths
Collingwood Football Club players
Collingwood Football Club Premiership players
Fitzroy Football Club players
Australian Football Hall of Fame inductees
Copeland Trophy winners
Camberwell Football Club players
Camberwell Football Club coaches
William Leitch Medal winners
Cananore Football Club players
Australian rules footballers from Melbourne
Brownlow Medal winners
Ivanhoe Amateurs Football Club players
Six-time VFL/AFL Premiership players
People from Collingwood, Victoria
Royal Australian Air Force personnel of World War II